Colmenarejo is a town and municipality in the autonomous community of Madrid in central Spain. It is located in the north of the Community of Madrid, near the town of Galapagar. It had a population of 9,124 in 2018.

.

It hosts a campus of the Universidad Carlos III de Madrid.

External links

 The official site of the city

References

Municipalities in the Community of Madrid